Mussanjeya Gelathi is a 2009 Indian Kannada-language film directed and produced by B P Srinivas starring himself and his daughter, Shalini Srinivas, in the lead roles.

Cast

 B P Srinivas as Manjunatha Rao
 Shalini Srinivas as Pallavi
 Gaurav
 Sanketh Kashi
 Navaneeth Srinivas
 Ganashree
 Maina Chandru
 Suma Rao
 Vanishree

Music

Reception

Critical response 

R G Vijayasarathy of Rediff.com scored the film at 2 out of 5 stars and says "For one, Srinivas has taken on too many responsibilities. While he shines as a director, as an actor he's not that good. Another drawback of the film is his daughter Shalini, who doesn't suit the role of a student. Mussanjeya Gelathi has a bold story which could have been executed in a better fashion". BS Srivani from Deccan Herald wrote "Mussanje Gelathi is bereft of direction though the producer takes credit for the same. He seems to have had a great picnic, at the expense of the viewers.  This Mussanje Gelathi will neither dispel darkness nor fear". A critic from Bangalore Mirror wrote  "Sadly, Srinivas is the biggest drawback of the film. He makes a decent effort in directing the film, but fails as an actor. With a seasoned actor in his place, the film might have gone places. Aided by some sedate scenes, Mussanje Gelati ends up with only two stars". Manju Shettar from Mid-Day wrote "Gaurav and Shalini's acting is good. Music is catchy and camera work is beautiful. Srinivas's acting does not impress the audience and dialogues are stale. Verdict: Watch it if you want to face a lot of confusion!".

References

2000s Kannada-language films
2009 films